Miguel Dungo Jr., also known as Mike Dungo, is a Filipino former tennis player.

Dungo played Davis Cup ties for the Philippines in 1958 and 1968, with his brother Eduardo an early teammate.

A-six time Asian Games medalist, Dungo's haul included a singles bronze at the 1958 Asian Games in Tokyo, where he shared the podium with three other Filipinos. The remaining medals were in doubles and team events.

His son, Miguel Dungo III, played on the professional tour in the 1980s.

References

External links
 
 

Year of birth missing (living people)
Living people
Filipino male tennis players
Asian Games medalists in tennis
Asian Games silver medalists for the Philippines
Asian Games bronze medalists for the Philippines
Medalists at the 1958 Asian Games
Medalists at the 1962 Asian Games
Tennis players at the 1958 Asian Games
Tennis players at the 1962 Asian Games